The Odd Fellows Lodge is a historic Odd Fellows clubhouse located at Goldsboro, Wayne County, North Carolina.  It was designed by E.G. Porter in Classical Revival and Romanesque styles. It was built in 1906, and is a three-story brick building.  It served historically as a clubhouse and as a specialty store.

It was listed on the National Register of Historic Places in 1978.

Gallery

References

Clubhouses on the National Register of Historic Places in North Carolina
Neoclassical architecture in North Carolina
Romanesque Revival architecture in North Carolina
Cultural infrastructure completed in 1906
Buildings and structures in Wayne County, North Carolina
Odd Fellows buildings in North Carolina
National Register of Historic Places in Wayne County, North Carolina